Stanley Anderson (1939–2018) was an American actor.

Stanley Anderson may also refer to:
Stanley Anderson (artist) (1884–1966), British engraver, etcher and watercolour painter
Stanley Thomas Anderson (born 1953), U.S. federal judge 
Stan Anderson (1933–2018), English footballer
Stan Anderson (Australian footballer) (1893–1953), Australian rules footballer
Stan Anderson (rugby union) (1871–1942), English rugby union player
Stan Anderson (Scottish footballer) (1939–1997), Scottish football player and manager

See also
 Stan Anderson (1917–1986), American football player